Disclaimer is the debut studio album by South African rock band Seether. The album was released on 20 August 2002. It features three successful singles which would remain some of the band's most well-known songs. It is their first release under their current name after changing it from Saron Gas in 2002 to avoid confusion with the deadly nerve agent sarin gas.

Background and release
A great deal of pre-production took place in South Africa with supervision from a Wind-up representative. It continued in New York City before the album recording sessions began in Los Angeles. Veteran session drummer Josh Freese filled the role in the studio before an audition took place at Leads Rehearsal Studio. Among sixteen others, Nick Oshiro auditioned and joined the band in 2001. Seether would also enlist guitarist Patrick Callahan in the fall of that year after performing alongside his then-current band in Philadelphia.

Disclaimer was released with ten different cover variations. These feature images from the "Fine Again" music video with people holding signs depicting a negative outlook or a poor situation in life. The concept to implement it through the album cover was headed by the video's director, Paul Feeder. According to bassist Dale Stewart:

"[Feeder] came up with the idea of the people bearing [sic] their souls and holding up the signs and we thought it was a good concept. It's kind of like a thread that runs through the whole album, the fragility, or whatever you want to call it, you know in people. People are always screwed up about something, even if they act like they're not."

In regards to recording and single output, the band allegedly faced a considerable deal of label pressure compared to future albums. According to a reflective Shaun Morgan in 2005:
"...With Disclaimer, we were still pretty green and all the say-so was made for us. We really didn’t have much and most of those decisions, I felt, were bad ones. Last time around we had a manager from South Africa. She wasn’t very good at what she was doing and she was letting [the record label] walk all over us."

According to Morgan, "the producer [Jay Baumgardner] was shit, so recording the album was a long process. The producer would come into the studio on Monday morning, after we worked for the entire week and say, 'nope, do it again'," partially because Baumgardner owned the recording studio and made a profit from them. As a result, the recording process for the album took three months, unlike later albums which took around two weeks.

Seven of the tracks that appeared on their previous album Fragile appeared re-recorded on Disclaimer. They were "Gasoline", "69 Tea," "Fine Again," "Driven Under," "Pride," "Your Bore," and "Pig". "Gasoline" had originally been a bonus track on Fragile. Eventually, it became a single along with "Fine Again" and "Driven Under", which had preceded it.

Songwriting
"69 Tea" was the first song that Shaun Morgan remembers writing. He has said: 

He also explained the song's meaning:

"Fine Again" is about how one can be fine again after a breakup. Morgan wrote it when his parents got divorced, to reflect how he was feeling at the time. He was in the middle of the divorce and going through a lot of pain.

At the age of 23, Morgan experienced heartbreak, which inspired the song "Broken". Morgan's wife did not follow him from their homeland of South Africa to the United States, and chose to live in South Africa with their daughter. Morgan thus felt he lost his best chance to have the family experience he always wanted. He explained:

Morgan wrote the song "Gasoline" in five minutes during soundcheck and the lyrics came out automatically. It is a song about all "MTV girls" and their fakeness.

One of Morgan's earliest memories is his mother waving a gun in his father's face. He was locked up along with his brother in the bathroom. Later, his mother gave him a loaded .45 caliber gun in case of danger. "Driven Under" was inspired by these memories.

Asked about the song called "Fade Away", he explained:

Shaun Morgan had a girlfriend who used to be a prostitute when she was 12 years old. The song "Love Her", off Disclaimer II, is about this woman. According to Morgan, she was a "rich kid". He added:

Musical style

Disclaimer gained comparison to grunge acts of the early 1990s, particularly the angsty vocal style of Nirvana's Kurt Cobain.

Touring and promotion

Seether began extensive touring in promotion of Disclaimer in July 2002. They performed alongside Our Lady Peace and other artists into the following year.

Beginning with "Fine Again" in the fall of 2002, a total of three singles were released from Disclaimer. The lead single was followed by "Driven Under" in early 2003 and "Gasoline" later that year. Each song was accompanied by a music video, all of which gained substantial airplay on MTV2.

Track listing
All tracks written by Shaun Morgan and Dale Stewart.

Personnel
Seether
 Shaun Morgan – lead vocals, guitar
 Dale Stewart – bass, backing vocals
 Josh Freese - drums (studio)
 Nick Oshiro – drums (live)

Production
 Jay Baumgardner — production, mixing
 Dan Certa — engineer
 Tom Baker — mastering

Charts

Certification

References

2002 debut albums
Seether albums
Wind-up Records albums

ru:Disclaimer